Molar refractivity, is a measure of the total polarizability of a mole of a substance and is dependent on the temperature, the index of refraction, and the pressure.

The molar refractivity is defined as

Substituting the molar refractivity into the Lorentz-Lorenz formula gives, for gasses

For a gas, so the molar refractivity can be approximated by

In terms of density ρ, molecular weight M, it can be shown that:

References

 Born, Max, and Wolf, Emil, Principles of Optics: Electromagnetic Theory of Propagation, Interference and Diffraction of Light (7th ed.), section 2.3.3, Cambridge University Press (1999) 

Physical chemistry
Physical optics